The 2016–17 Maine Black Bears women's basketball team represented the University of Maine in the 2016–17 NCAA Division I women's basketball season. The Black Bears, led by sixth year head coach Richard Barron, played their home games at the Cross Insurance Center and were members of the America East Conference. They finished the season 18–16, 9–7 in America East play to finish in fifth place. They advanced to the championship game of the America East women's tournament where they lost to Albany.

Media
All home games and conference road games will stream on either ESPN3 or AmericaEast.tv. Most road games will stream on the opponents website. All games will be broadcast on the radio on WGUY and online on the Maine Portal.

Roster

Schedule

|-
!colspan=12 style="background:#000050; color:#FFFFFF;"| Exhibition

|-
!colspan=12 style="background:#000050; color:#FFFFFF;"| Non-conference regular season

|-
!colspan=12 style="background:#000050; color:#FFFFFF;"| America East regular season

|-
!colspan=12 style="background:#000050; color:#FFFFFF;"| America East Women's Tournament

See also
2016–17 Maine Black Bears men's basketball team

References

Maine
Maine Black Bears women's basketball seasons
Maine
Maine